USRC Relief, was a revenue cutter of the United States Revenue Cutter Service in commission from 1867 to at least 1870.  She was the first Revenue Cutter Service ship to bear the name.

History
Built at Philadelphia, Pennsylvania, by Bierly & Hillman, Relief was commissioned in 1867 and served what is known of her entire career homeported at Indianola, Texas. She was the lead ship of the Relief-class of two revenue schooners built to her specifications. Relief and her sister ship, Rescue also built by Bierly & Hillman, were among the last strictly sail-powered cutters built for the Revenue Service. On 18 September Relief was transferred temporarily to Key West, Florida due to an outbreak of yellow fever in the Indianola area. She returned from Key West on 5 December 1867. On 19 July 1870, she sailed for New Orleans for scheduled repairs. No Revenue Cutter Service record exists of her movements after 19 July 1870.

Notes
Footnotes

Citations

References used

 
 
 
 

Ships of the United States Revenue Cutter Service
Age of Sail ships of the United States
Ships built in Philadelphia
1867 ships